Phisqa Tira (Aymara phisqa five, tira cradle, "five cradles", Hispanicized spelling Piscatira) is a mountain in the Andes of Peru, about  high. It is located in the Puno Region, Lampa Province, on the border of the districts Paratía and Santa Lucía. Phisqa Tira lies northeast of the mountain Awallani.

References

Mountains of Puno Region
Mountains of Peru